Daði Lár Jónsson (born 23 October 1996) is an Icelandic basketball player and former sprinter. During his basketball career, he won the Icelandic Basketball Cup twice as a member of Stjarnan and once with Valur.

Basketball career
Daði came up through the junior programs of Stjarnan. In January 2016, he moved over to Keflavík, where his father had starred. He left the club in July 2018. In August 2018, he signed with Haukar. For the 2018–19 season, he averaged 8.4 points and team leading 3.8 assists.

Personal life
Daði's father, Jón Kr. Gíslason, played 158 games for the Icelandic national team between 1982 and 1995 and coached the national team from 1995 to 1999. Daði's brothers, Dagur Kár Jónsson and Dúi Þór Jónsson, have also played in the Úrvalsdeild karla.

References

External links
Icelandic statistics at Icelandic Basketball Association

1996 births
Living people
Dadi Lar Jonsson
Dadi Lar Jonsson
Dadi Lar Jonsson
Dadi Lar Jonsson
Dadi Lar Jonsson
Dadi Lar Jonsson